The Supreme Court of Uzbekistan is the most senior body of civil, criminal, and administrative law in the Republic of Uzbekistan. It is currently composed of the Supreme Court and the Supreme Economic Court, which were merged in February 2017.

References

External links
Official site

Law of Uzbekistan
Government of Uzbekistan
Uzbekistan